Kalathappam (കലത്തപ്പം) is a food from North Malabar and South Malabar, especially Kannur, Malappuram and Kasaragod. It is known as kalthappa by the Beary Muslims of Mangalore.

It is a rice cake made of ground rice (brown rice), water, coconut oil, jaggery sugar, fried onions or shallots, coconut flakes, cardamom powder. It is cooked in a pan like a pancake or baked in a traditional oven or even steamed in a rice cooker.

Preparation
The traditional Kasaragodian way of cooking kalathappam is a bit different from other places. The batter of rice, coconut flakes, onions, cardamom and water is poured into hot oil in a traditional utensil called uruli. Metal is placed over the uruli over which fire is placed in coconut shells. It is heated from above and below. This makes a crunchy shell all over.

See also
 North Malabar

References

Cakes
Indian desserts
Indian rice dishes
Pancakes
South Indian cuisine
Foods containing coconut
Kerala cuisine